The Oxford Ring Road  circles the city of Oxford, England. It is a dual carriageway ring road for most of its length apart from a short section between Woodstock Road and Banbury Road in the north of the city. The severe restrictions on traffic in Oxford city centre mean that it is the only practical way for long-distance traffic to get past Oxford, especially as there are few road bridges over the rivers Isis and Cherwell. Five Park and Rides are close to the ring road.

Description

To the north, the connection to complete the ring (under  in total) includes a short section of the A40 ("Sunderland Avenue"; this is the only part that is not a dual carriageway) and a short section of the A44 ("Woodstock Road"). 

History
The north-eastern section, from Headington to Banbury Road, is the oldest part of the Oxford Ring Road. It was built in the mid-1930s and is part of the A40. 

In 1938 the southern part of the western section was opened from the bottom of Hinksey Hill to Botley. The road was known as the "road to nowhere" and little used at that time. In 1962 it was extended north by a new bridge over the River Thames to Wolvercote, and the whole western section then became part of the A34. It was dualled in 1973.

The south-eastern section between Headington and Rose Hill was opened in 1959. The southern section between Hinksey Hill and Heyford Hill, including the new Isis Bridge over the River Thames, was opened in 1965. The ring road was completed when the short section between Rose Hill and Heyford Hill was opened in 1966.

The ring road has suffered major problems in recent years as housing developments are built next to the ring road leading to more traffic light intersections and roadworks. The latest traffic intersection on the Barton Park development, which opened in 2017, brings the total number of traffic light intersections on the ring road to 22. 

In 2023, Oxfordshire County Council plans to rebuild the Kennington Bridge due to degradation of the bridge deck bearings, which due to the bridge design, cannot easily be replaced.  The rebuilding process involves several utility diversions and also building over a major railway line and two Thames tributaries

References 

Hibbert, C. (ed) (1988) Encyclopedia of Oxford Macmillan 

Ring road
Roads in Oxfordshire
Ring roads in the United Kingdom